, literally Everyone's Songs (English title: Songs for Everyone), is a five-minute NHK TV and radio program which is broadcast several times daily. The program started on April 3, 1961. It is one of NHK's long-running programs.

The program is generally used as filler between programs. While many of the episodes are aimed at children, a large percentage are not, so the program enjoys a wide audience.

The program is used to introduce new songs from popular and new singers, as well as to highlight the talents of various animators and directors. A list of upcoming and currently airing episodes is listed monthly in magazines such as Animage and Newtype.

Songs introduced on Minna no Uta
Listed alphabetically by title, with the artist or group in parentheses.

0–9
"3-D Tengoku" (Psy-S) 
"44 Hiki no Neko" (Tokyo Hōsō Jidō Gasshōdan)

A
"Aa Okashii ne" (Tokyo Jidō Gasshōdan)
"After man" (Akemi Okamura)
"Ahiru no Gyōretsu" (The Shaderacks, Tokyo Arakawa Shōnen Gasshōtai)
"Ahiru to Shōjo" (Kurumi Kobata)
"Ai Dattan Da yo" (Kōji Tamaki)
"Ai ni Iku no." (Tomoe Shinohara)
"Ai no Tabidachi" (Anna Saeki)
"Aiko desho" (Yūki Kidō, Hibari Jidō Gasshōdan)
"Aitsu no Hang Glider" (Mieko Nishijima)
"Aji no Hiraki no Sando Kasa" (Hiromi Yamashita)
"Aka-chan" (Mitsuko Horie)
"Akai Bōshi" (Satoko Shimonari)
"Akai Hana Shiro Hana" (Vickies)
"Akai Hoshi Aoi Hoshi: Tenmon Karat no Hoshi kara" (Saori Yuki)
"Akai Ito" (Yōko Seri)
"Akai Jitensha" (hana*hana)
"Akai Sarafan" (Naoko Ken)
"Akaoni to Aooni no Tango" (Isao Bitō)
"Aki Monogatari" (Kiyohiko Ozaki)
"Akikaze ni Nosete" (Ritsuko Ōwada, Hiromi Okazaki)
"Akikaze no Promenade" (Fumio Yamasawa)
"Akisutozeneko" (Akisutozeniko!)
"Akiuta" (Senri Ōe)
"Alice no Kisetsu" (Chikako Sawada)
"Amaryllis" (Mieko Hirota, Singing Angels)
"Ame ga Sora kara Fureba" (Hitoshi Komura)
"Ame no Ten Ten" (Naoko Kawai)
"Ame no Yūenchi" (Mie Nakao)
"Ame nochi Special" (Mariko Kōda)
"Anata ga Mieru" (Tea for Three)
"Ano Hashi Watare" (Yukio Hashi)
"Anogoro no Namida wa" (Yōko Nagayama)
"Aoi Dōwa" (Chiaki) 
"Aotenjō no Crown" (Soul Flower Union)
"Aozora" (Kayo Yoshimoto)
"Aozora to Tap Dance" (Ikue Sakakibara)
"Apple Purple Princess" (Mariya Takeuchi)
"Apron Hero" (Hiroyuki Igarashi, Kiyoshi Ōzawa) 
"Arigato Thank You" (Ikue Kakeromanzu)
"Arigatō" (Keiko Utsumi)
"Arigatō Sayōnara" (Kiichi Nakai, Naoko Yoshida)
"Arinko to Himawari" (Yōko Nagayama)
"Aruite Mikka!" (George Tokoro)
"Asa no Lift de" (Dark Ducks)
"Asa Okitan" (Shōnen Shōjo Gasshōdan Mizuumi)
"Ashita" (Chieko Baisho)
"Ashita ha Genki: More Music!" (Miyoko Yoshimoto)
"Assō ka!" (Kunihiko Tamai)
"Attara Ii naa" (Half Moon)
"Awate Tokoya" (Bonny Jacks)

B
"Beautiful Name" (Godiego)
"Boku wa Kuma" (Hikaru Utada) "'Boku wa Kuma Official site"'

C
"Cabbage UFO" (Junko Kudō) 
"Candy no Yume" (Ami Ozaki) 
"Catch: Tsubi no Natsu ga Kuru yō ni" (135) 
"Chameleon" (Sugar) 
"Chanto Kao ni Kaitearu" (Iruka) 
"Chichinpuipui" (Miyuki Mori, Tokyo Hōsō Jidō Gasshōdan) 
"Chigueso Chikyu no Sora no Shitade" (Yoo Hae Joon) 
"Chikyū wa Genki" (Chikyū Genkimura no Nakamatachi) 
"Chikyū wa Minna no Dai Gasshō" (Suginami Junior Chorus) 
"Chimu Chimu Cherry" (Masanori Tomotake, Suginami Junior Chorus) 
"Chii-chan no Himitsu" (Ritsuko Ōwada) 
"Chiisai Aki Mitsuketa" (Bonny Jacks) 
"Chiisanakinomi" (Teruko Ōba) 
"Chiisana Tegami" (Yukio Hashi, Kazuo Funaki, Teruhiko Saigō) 
"Chitchana Photographer" (Hitomi Ishikawa) 
"Chotto Zutsu Aki" (Kuniko Yamada) 
"Christmas ga Sugite mo" (Christy & Clinton) 
"Chun Chun World ~Ogenki Taoisō~" (Ritsuko Ōwada, Hiromi Okazaki, Koji Imada, Koji Higashino, Yukio Iketani, Children's Chorus Genki-Gumi) 
"Chun Chun World ~Magic Carnival~" (Ritsuko Ōwada, Hiromi Okazaki, Children's Chorus Genki-Gumi) 
"Computer Obaa-chan" (Yūko Sakaitsukasa)

D
"Daimyō Kyōretsu" (Seiji Tanaka) 
"Dakedo I Love You" (Oyunna) 
"Dare mo Shiranai"

E
"E-WaH-OH" (The Voice of Japan) 
"Egao" (Hiromi Iwasaki) 
"Egao ga Kaze ni Modoru Shunkan" (Yoshiaki Ōuchi & Taeko) 
"Egao ni Daisekkin" (Kyoto Performance Doll) 
"Eto wa Merry-go-round" (Seiji Tanaka, Tokyo Hōsō Jidō Gasshōdan)

F
"Futari Bocchi Jikan" (Shiina Ringo)
"Fight" (YUI)
"Furusato" (Arashi)
"Fūsen" (Mayumi Kojima)

G
"Gakkō Sakamichi" (Muneyuki Satō) 
"Gamushāra" (Katsuya Kobayashi) 
"Ganbaranba" (Masashi Sada) 
"Ganbare My Boy" (Hiro Tsunoda) 
"Ganzō Banana no Tama" (Kōtarō Yamamoto, Tokyo Hōsō Jidō Gasshōdan) 
"Genki no Deru Uta" (Bonny Jacks) 
"Go Go! Kokekokkō" (Ryūsei Nakao) 
"Gōkaku Rock 'n' Roll" (Yukari Morikawa) 
"Gomennasai" (1970)
"Gomen yo! Wan Wan" (Keita to Kōta) 
"Gorilla no Mentama" (Ryōko Sano) 
"Gottso-sama" (Tomō Sugai) 
"Grasshopper Monogatari" (Noppo Takami)

H
"Ha-i! glasshopper" (Noppo Takami)
"Hasta Luego: Sayonara Tsuki no Neko" (Naoko Ken)
"Hakimono to Kasa no Monogatari"(履物と傘の物語) (AKB48)
"Hato no Uta" (Da Capo) 
 "Hikaru no Gen-chan" (Showta)
"Hen na ABC" (Miyuki Ichijo, Tokyo Hōsō Jidō Gasshōdan) 
"Hige Hige Gehi Ponpon" (Tanqun Democracy)
"Hoyahoyara" (Hajime Anzai and Friends)

I
"I Love Tofu" (Shōji Koganezawa) 
"Ichiban Kirei na Hoshi" (Chiyoko Shimakura) 
"Ichiendama no Tabi Garasu" (Saori Hareyama) 
"Ichō Dance" (Mirei Kitahara) 
"Ii ne!!" (Takako Ōta, Yōsuke Sone, Yūko Miyakawa) 
"Ijiwaru Tenki" (BaBe) 
"Imademo Sencho to Yobareteiru Sencho no Yoru" (Yoichi Sugawara)
"Inochi no Hanashi o Shiyō" (Judy Ongg) 
"Inori" (Kaori Futenma) 
"Irassyai" (Chieko Baisyo)
"Iroha Matsuri" (Miyuki Mori, Hibari Jidō Gasshōdan) 
"Iruka La Bamba" (Naomi Matsui) 
"Ishin Denshin Shiyō" (Mitsue Ōshiro) 
"Itazurakko" (Ado Mizumori, Tokyo Jidō Gasshōdan) 
"Itsumo Egao de" (Shū Saeko)

J
"Jabu Jabu Ondo" (Hibari Jidō Gasshōdan) 
"Jagaimo Jagā" (Seiji Tanaka, Tokyo Hōsō Jidō Gasshōdan) 
"Jōkyūsei" (Hiroko Moriguchi) 
"Joy: Yorokobi no Kuni" (Yū Hayami) 
"Jungle Dance" (Yōko Oginome) 
"Just Friends: Itsu Made mo" (Aya, Tokyo Hōsō Jidō Gasshōdan)

K
"Kaa-san no Uta" (Peggy Hayama) 
"Kaa-san wa Yuki Onna" (Mitsuko Horie) 
"Kabocha no Oji-san" (Tessei Miyoshi, Tokyo Hōsō Jidō Gasshōdan) 
"Kagayaiteite: 10 Years After" (Asari Mizuki) 
"Kagayaki no Achira e" (Yōko Ishida) 
"Kaitō Yumenosuke" (Hiromi Okazaki) 
"Kakenukete Good-bye" (B'dash) 
"Kamekame Dance" (Yumi Matsuba) 
"Kanashiki Mongoose" (Seiji Tanaka) 
"Kani-san Kani-san" (Takuzō Kawatani) 
"Kankan Karasu" (Tokiko Katō) 
"Kanshajō" (Reiko Sada) 
"Kaori-chan Time" (Yumi Tanimura) 
"Kappa no Kui Kuo Kua" (Kappa no Qui Quo Qua) 
"Karucharatan no Sora" (Karyūdo) 
"Kasei no Circus-dan" (Yoshitaka Minami) 
"Katte Chō" (Tomoko Tane) 
"Kawa wa Dare no Mono?" (Tokyo Hōsō Jidō Gasshōdan) 
"Kawazura ga Kirakira" (Shōko Inoue, Tokyo Hōsō Jidō Gasshōdan) 
"Kazaguruma" (Miyuki Nagai) 
"Kazaguruma" (Sachiko Kobayashi) 
"Kaze ga Kureta Melody" (Richard Bona) 
"Kaze no Ban" (Yōichi Sugawara) 
"Kaze no Organ" (Junko Kudō) 
"Kaze no Tōri Michi" (Sayuri Horishita) 
"Kaze no Uta ha Kikoemasu ka" (Yumi Yoshikawa) 
"Kazeiro no Tonba" (Chie Hyo) 
"Ken-chan" (Youki Kudoh) 
"Kiiro no Jitensha" (Toshiharu Fujisawa) 
"Kimi ga Wasurete Ōki na Mono" (Angie) 
"Kimi ni Sachiare" (Reiko Sada) 
"Kimi no Iro Hoshi" (Hikaru Nishida) 
"Kimi no Te" (Mitsuko Horie) 
"Kimi wa Nagai ne" (Hiro Tsunoda) 
"Kin no Makiba" (Taeko Ōnuki) 
"Kinō Kyō Ashita" (Miyuki Kōsaka) 
"Kisetsu wa Sugite mo" (Chiemi) 
"Kitakaze Kazō no Kantarō" (Masaaki Sakai, Tokyo Hōsō Jidō Gasshōdan) 
"Kitchen Lady" (Ritsuko Ōwada) 
"Kite no Nai Okurimono" (Kazuo Zaitsu) 
"Kitto Shiawase" (Saeko Shū) 
"Kobutanoshippo" (Sugar) 
"Kodanuki Ponpo" (Atomu Shimojō) 
"Kodomo Dake no Natsu" (Yukihiro Takahashi) 
"Kohaku no Mahō" (Epo) 
"Koi Hanabi" (Mio Isayama) 
"Koi no Hana  Saita" (Chizuru Kohigashi) 
"Koi Tsubomi" (Hanako Oku) 
"Koinu no Blue" (Rutsuko Honda) 
"Koisuru Niwatori" (Hiroko Taniyama) 
"Koi no Subesube Manjūgani" (Imakuni?) 
"Kōkō 3-nensei" (Naotarō Moriyama) 
"Koko de Mata Aō" (Yuka Kamebuchi & The Voices of Japan) 
"Kokoro ni Yume o" (Yōko Seri) 
"Kokoro no Umi" (Ajinai Hall) 
"Kokoro wa Hallelujah" (Kabocha Shōkai) 
"Kome no Uta" (Metrofarce) 
"Koneko no Byōki" (Vocce Angelica) 
"Koneko to Keito" (Tokyo Hōsō Jidō Gasshōdan) 
"Kono Ai o: Onee-san e" (Amin, Wei Wei Wuu) 
"Kono Hiroi Nohara Ippai" (Ryōko Moriyama) 
"Kono Mune Oide" (Atsushi Onita, Keiko Nakajima, Masayuki Tanaka) 
"Koro wa Yane no Ue" (Taeko Ōnuki) 
"Kotatsu Musume de Teketekete" (Naoko Nozawa) 
"Kuchibue Fuitara" (Miho Gomi, Tokyo Hōsō Jidō Gasshōdan) 
"Kuishinbō no Calendar" (Sumiko Yamagata, Suginami Junior Chorus) 
"Kuma no Nuigurumi" (Yūsuke Yoshioka, Tokyo Hōsō Jidō Gasshōdan) 
"Kumanbachiga Tonde Kita" (Akiko Yano, Miu Sakamoto) 
"Kumo" (Tarō Masuda) 
"Kumo ga Haretara" (Etsuko Sai) 
"Kuro" (Mimori Yusa) 
"Kyō mo Chappīendo" (Duke Aces) 
"Kyōfu no Hiruyasumi" (The Boom) 
"Kyōshitsu Ōwarai" (Miyuki Ichijō, Suginami Junior Chorus)

L

M
"Makkuramori no Uta" (Taniyama Hiroko)
"Message Song" (Pizzicato Five)
"Metropolitan Museum" (Taeko Onuki)
"Moonfesta" (Kalafina)
"Mori no Kuma-san (The Other Day I Met a Bear)" (Dark Ducks)
"Morning Musume no Hyokkori Hyōtanjima" (Morning Musume)
"MOTTAINAI" (Lou Oshiba&Masahiro Niiyama)
"Mushi'98" (GO!GO!7188)
"Mushi no Tsubuyaki" (Yōko Oginome)

N
"Nekkokun" (Joji Yamamoto)
"Nobiro Nobiro Daisukina Ki" (Ann Sally) 
"No ni Saku Hana no yō ni" (Gackt)
"Negaigoto no Mochigusare" (AKB48)

O
"Obaa-chan Moshikashite" (Emiko Shiratori) 
"Obaa-chan no Takaramono" (Yoshiko Kawase) 
"Obake to Issho" (Tokyo Performance Doll) 
"Oboeteimasu ka" (Kiyoshi Maekawa) 
"Oburadioburada" (Four Leaves) 
"Off Stage" (Akiko Kobayashi) 
"Ofuro no Uta" (Yūya Ioki) 
"Ofuroya-san e Tsuretette" (Yūta Hashizume, Tokyo Hōsō Jidō Gasshōdan) 
"Ogenki Mī-chan" (Satoko Shimonari) 
"Oh Makiba wa Midori" (Tokyo Shōnen Gasshōdan) 
"Oh My Wind: Sora wa Tomodachi" (Kiyoshi Sonehara) 
"Ohayō Crayon" (Hiroko Taniyama) 
"Ohirune no Yurikago" (Yōko Ishida) 
"Oira ni Horecha Kagesuruze!" (Kazuki Enari) 
"Ojii-chan no Blanco" (Eiko Hiramatsu) 
"Ojii-chan no Komoriuta" (Yūji Akimoto) 
"Ojii-chan-te Ii na" (Motoshi Shidō) 
"Ōki na Furudokei (My Grandfather's Clock)" (Sumito Tachikawa, Nagato Miho Kagekidan Jidō Gasshōbu) 
"Ōki na Ringo no Ki no Shita de" (Da Capo) 
"Ōki na Tsuki" (Kaori Morikawa) 
"Omoide" (Miyuki Mori) 
"Omoide Matsuri" (Miyuki Asō) 
"Omoide ni Tokenagara" (Hikaru Nishida) 
"Omoide no Album" (Dark Ducks) 
"Omoikkiri Yume" (Yū Mizushima, Katsushika AK Kinder Call) 
"Onaka no Ōki na Ōji-sama" (Kōichi Kawazu) 
"Onii-chan Zurui" (Nobunari Kitamoto) 
"Onii-chan ni Nacchatta" (Tomoe Wakamatsu) 
"Orangutan" (Yasunori Sōryō & Jim Rock Singers) 
"Orizuru" (Takako Yamamura) 
"Ōsaka Humanland: Yanka!" (Naniwa Gospellers) 
"Osampo" (Char) 
"Oshiri Kajiri Mushi" (Uruma Delvi) 
"Otanjōbi Omedetō" (Megumi Shiina) 
"Otō-san" (Asami Hayashi) 
"Otogi no Kuni no Birthday" (Noriko Sakai) 
"Otoshidama" (Hikari Ishida) 
"Otsukaresan" (Begin)

P
"Papa to Rusuban" (Yumi Endo)
"Popo Loouise" (Kuricorder Quartet and UA)

Q

R
"Raja Maharaja" (Jun Togawa)
"Ringo no Uta" (Shiina Ringo)

S
"Saboten ga Nikui" (Kuniko Yamada) 
"Saibō no Fushigi" (Testsu and Tomo) 
"Saigo no Shoot" (Sway) 
"Saka Agari no Yūyake" (Kuniyoshi Kiyosu) 
"Sakura, Mau" (Azumi Inoue) 
"Sakyū Neko" (Susumu Hirasawa) 
"Sanjō Osagarisetsu" (Azusa Katō) 
"Sansū Cha Cha Cha" (Peggy Hayama, Young 101) 
"Santa Maria" (Tsukasa Takei) 
"San'yūka" (Ranbō Minami, Yoshie Ichige) 
"Saraba Seishun" (Ken Tanaka) 
"Saramandara" (Isao Hidō) 
"Sarusa Iina Iine" (Hey! Say! 7) 
"Satōkibi Hatake" (Naomi Chiaki) 
"Sayōnara Concert" (Kazuo Zaitsu) 
"Seishun no Kao" (Ai Miyata) 
"Sekai ga Ichiban Shiawase na Hi" (Kusu Kusu) 
"Sekai o Musbō" (Sandora, Mori no Ki Gasshōdan) 
"Sekai wa Melody" (Shigeru Muroi) 
"Sen no Hana Sen no Sora" (Manami Kiyota) 
"Senaka de Twist" (George Tokoro) 
"Senro wa tsuzuku yo doko made mo (I've Been Working on the Railroad)"
"Sense Honma ni Honma" (Osaka Sumiyoshi Shōnen Shōjo Gasshōdan) 
"Sensei wa Hashiru" (Masanori Tomotake, Tokyo Hōsō Jidō Gasshōdan) 
"Seru no Koi" (Akinori Nakagawa) 
"Shiawase Kyōryū Ondo" (Odoru 11) 
"Shiawase no Uta" (Ikue Sakakibara) 
"Shiawase no Yokan" (Naoyoshi Kamata, Yūko Yamaji) 
"Shijin to Tsubame" (Hitoshi Komura) 
"Shinpu-san no Pipe Organ" (Agnes Chan, Tokyo Hōsō Jidō Gasshōdan) 
"Shio no Nioi no Suru Machi de" (Suginami Junior Chorus) 
"Shiosai no Uta" (Bell & Accordions) 
"Shippo no Kimochi" (Hiroko Taniyama) 
"Shiranburi" (Tomoya Takayama) 
"Shiroi Michi" (Haifaisetto) 
"Shiroi Shōjo" (Yoshito Machida) 
"Shiroi Spitz" (Beagle Hat) 
"Shobokujira Chibi Cobra" (Tokyo Hōsō Jidō Gasshōdan) 
"Shooting Hero" (Duke Aces) 
"Shusse Ondo da yo!" (Saori Hareyama) 
"Smile" (Anna Banana) 
"Soba ni Ite yo Teddy bear" (Mio Watanabe) 
"Snowdrop" (Asuka Hayashi) 
"Soccer Boy" (Nao Nakadai) 
"Sōgen Jōka" (Chie Hyo) 
"Sokkuri Haha Musume" (Fusako Amachi) 
"Sokkuri House" (Hiroko Taniyama) 
"Sōmatō" (Hiromi Iwasaki) 
"Sonna Boku ga Suki" (Tama) 
"Sora e" (Tomotaka Okamoto) 
"Sora ga Boku no Otō-san" (Kazuo Zaitsu) 
"Sora no Chorus" (Meninas do Brasil) 
"Sora no Ocarina" (Junko Iwao) 
"Soratobu Kujira" (Yoshio Toyama, Dixie Saints) 
"Soratobu Penguin" (Katsumi Takita) 
"Soratobu Ringo" (Kazuo Zaitsu) 
"Sōshite Kimi wa" (Garo) 
"Sōshunbu" (Shōnan Chor Grün) 
"Sotsugyō Mae: 10-hi de 100 no Dekigoto" (Ayako Shimizu) 
"Sowa Sowa Calendar" (Hiromi Okazaki) 
"Sōyamisaki" (Da Capo) 
"Step by Step" (Toshinori Yonekura) 
"Sudatsuhi Made" (Yumiko Tanaka) 
"Susume! Hakkushon Baby" (Noriko Sakai) 
"Symphonic Variation" (The Kingtones)

T
"Ta Chi Tsu Te To Te o" (Henry Band with M) 
"Tabi no Suki na Anata ni" (Minako Shioda) 
"Tabibito no yō ni" (Takao Horiuchi) 
"Tabidachi" (Yūzō Kayama) 
"Tabidachi no Uta" (Akiko Wada, Mori no Ki Gasshōdan) 
"Tadaima Shiawase" (Kiichi Nakai) 
"Taian Kichijitsu" (Cauliflower) 
"Taihen daa" (Tokyo Hōsō Jidō Gasshōdan) 
"Taiyō no Kodomotachi" (Lisa Ono, Noriko Matsuhara) 
"Taiyō no Toki" (Kaho Shimada) 
"Tanishi-chan" (Kensaku Morita) 
"Tanoshii Sansū" (Seiji Tanaka, Tokyo Hōsō Jidō Gasshōdan) 
"Terebi ga Kita Hi" (Pink Lady)
"Time: Toki no Shiori" (Kengo Suzuki) 
"Toge Meku Spica" (Polkadot Stingray) 
"Torero Kamomiro" (Nishi Rokugo Shonen Shōjo Gasshodan)
"Tsuki" (YOU&Mitsuru)
"Tsuki no Hikari" (Yōko Seri, Tokyo Torubēru) 
"Tsuki no Fuusen" (Yoko Takahashi) 
"Tsuki no Waltz" (Mio Isayama)

U
"Uchū Hikōshi no Uta" (Maaya Sakamoto) 
"Uchū no Uta" (Moro Fukuzawa) 
"Uchū wa Tanoshii Festival" (Cherish) 
"Uma Uma Ramen" (Rie Kameoka) 
"Umi e Kite" (Masako Mori) 
"Uja Kuju?" (Hikaru Nishida) 
"Uta wa Tomodachi" (Sapporo Kodomo Musical Group)

V

W
"Wa ni natte Odoro" (AGHARTA)
"Watage no Osampo" (Inotomo)
"Watashi to Kotori to Suzu to" (Tsutomu Aragaki)
"Watashi no Subete" (Kyogo Kawaguchi)

X

Y
"Yamaguchi san chi no Tsutomu kun" (Ranbō Minami)
"Yamiyami" (Etsuko Yakushimaru)
"Yell" (Ikimono-gakari)
"Yes, You" (Reiko Yamahata) 
"Yūkyū no Mori" (Kokia)

Z
"Zō da Zō" (Isao Sasaki) 
"Zutto Tomodachi" (Keiko Utsumi)

Animators
These animators have had their works appear on Minna no Uta.

Creatures
Seiji Fujishiru
Osamu Fukushima
Taku Furukawa
Yoshiko Hada
Yūji Hasegawa
Seiichi Hayashi
Kunpei Higashi
Norio Hikone
Yukio Honda
Tadahiko Horiguchi
Kazuhiro Hotchi
Rumiko Hoya
Umanosuke Iida
Yuka Imabayashi
Atsuko Ishizuka
Azuru Isshiki
Yūichi Itō

Yoshirō Kajitani
Takashi Kamata
Akira Katō
Yōko Kinoshita
Keizō Kira
Tameo Kohanawa
Mayumi Kojima
Katsuya Kondō
Kazuaki Kozutsumi (Kozutsumi PON)
Tatsuji Kurahashi
Yōji Kuri
Hiroshi Kuzuoga
Akira Maeda
Kazumi Matsumoto
Tomomi Mochizuki
Atsushi Mōri
Masaaki Mori
Yūji Moriyama

Shinji Nagashima
Shūichi Nakahara
Kiyoshi Nakashima
Takahito Nakazawa
Kōji Nanke
Hiroshi Nishimura
Toshio Nishiuchi
Hiroshi Ogawa
Fumio Ōi
Tadanari Okamoto
Shingo Ozaki
Osamu Sakai
Seku Sakamoto
Tsutomu Shibayama
Makoto Shinkai
Tadashi Sugawara
Haruka Suzuki
Natsuki Takaya
Yoshiyuki Takeguchi

Keiko Tanaka
Naoya Tanaka
Three-D
Sadao Tsukioka
Kimihiko Tsukuda
Uruma Delvi
Makoto Wada
Jōji Wakai
Takashi Yanase
Kōtaku Yoshinaga

References

External links
  
 Nemuritari: Unofficial NHK Minna no Uta site 
 

 
1961 anime television series debuts
1961 Japanese television series debuts
1961 radio programme debuts
Interstitial television shows
Japanese children's radio programs
Japanese music radio programs
Japanese music television series
NHK original programming
Radio programs adapted into television shows
Animated musical television series